Valentyna Salamakha (Ukrainian: Валентина Саламаха born 23 April 1986) is an Azerbaijani professional handball goalkeeper who plays for SG BBM Bietigheim.

Career
Arriving from Bayer Leverkusen, Salamakha signed a two-year contract with Siófok KC in 2015. Just after a season the Azerbaijani international moved back to Germany, signing to SG BBM Bietigheim.

References

Azerbaijani female handball players
Siófok KC players
1986 births
Living people
Sportspeople from Kropyvnytskyi